Sherman Stanley Corbett (born November 3, 1962) is an American former professional baseball player who played three seasons for the California Angels of Major League Baseball (MLB). He was the head baseball coach at the University of Texas at San Antonio until he became the assistant to the athletic director in 2012.

Head coach record

References

1962 births
Living people
American expatriate baseball players in Canada
American expatriate baseball players in Mexico
Baseball coaches from Texas
Baseball players from Texas
California Angels players
Daytona Cubs players
Edmonton Trappers players
Iowa Cubs players
London Tigers players
Major League Baseball pitchers
Mexican League baseball pitchers
Midland Angels players
Orlando Cubs players
People from New Braunfels, Texas
Piratas de Campeche players
Redwood Pioneers players
Sportspeople from New Braunfels, Texas
Salem Angels players
Texas A&M Aggies baseball players
Toledo Mud Hens players
UTSA Roadrunners baseball coaches